Piotr Grzegorz Klepczarek (born 13 August 1982) is a former Polish footballer.

Successes

 1x Polish Cup Winner (2010) with Jagiellonia Białystok.

Career

Club
In January 2011, he joined Ukrainian Premier League side Tavriya Simferopol on a two-year contract.

References

External links 
 
 

Polish footballers
Polish expatriate footballers
Expatriate footballers in Ukraine
Polish beach soccer players
1982 births
ŁKS Łódź players
Unia Janikowo players
GKS Bełchatów players
Wisła Płock players
Jagiellonia Białystok players
SC Tavriya Simferopol players
KSZO Ostrowiec Świętokrzyski players
Living people
Footballers from Łódź
Polish expatriate sportspeople in Ukraine
Association football defenders
Stal Rzeszów players